Zombi 2 is a 1979 Italian zombie film directed by Lucio Fulci. It was adapted from an original screenplay by Dardano Sacchetti to serve as a sequel to George A. Romero's Dawn of the Dead (1978), which was released in Italy with the title Zombi. It stars Tisa Farrow, Ian McCulloch, and Richard Johnson, and features a score by frequent Fulci collaborator Fabio Frizzi. Frizzi's score has been released independently of the film, and he has performed it live on tour.

The film tells the story of a Caribbean island cursed by voodoo whose dead residents rise as zombies to attack the living. A scientist's daughter journeys to the island after her father's boat turns up abandoned in New York City. Intended by its writer as a return to "classic zombie tales", Zombi 2 was filmed in Italy, with further location shooting in New York and Santo Domingo.

Produced on a small budget of 410 million Italian lira, the film earned several times its production costs back in international gross. It attracted controversy upon its release in the United Kingdom, where it became listed as a "video nasty". However, in the subsequent years the film received a greater appreciation from critics, and has gained a cult following.

Plot
An abandoned boat drifts into New York Harbor, and is boarded by two harbor patrolmen. A hidden zombie kills one of the patrolmen, but is shot by the patrolman’s partner and falls overboard; the dead patrolman's body is taken to the morgue. Anne Bowles (Tisa Farrow) is questioned by police, as the boat belonged to her father. She claims he is conducting research on Matul, a Caribbean island. British journalist Peter West (Ian McCulloch), is investigating the story; he and Bowles learn that Bowles' father is suffering from a strange illness on the island. They hire a boat and two guides—Brian Hull (Al Cliver) and his girlfriend Susan Barrett (Auretta Gay)—to reach Matul.

Meanwhile, on Matul, British doctor David Menard (Richard Johnson), and his wife Paola (Olga Karlatos) have been researching the phenomenon of zombie reanimation. Paola wishes to flee the island, but Menard insists on staying. That night, Paola is alone in the house when a zombie tries to enter; she pushes the door shut but it breaks through with one arm. Paola is dragged through the hole and killed, with her eye being gouged out by splintered wood.

Approaching Matul, Barrett dives in the ocean around the boat. She encounters a shark, and flees behind a reef only to be accosted by a submerged zombie. Surfacing, she reaches the boat while the shark and zombie attack each other. Eventually, the boat docks at Matul.

Menard is alarmed to find that one of his colleagues, Fritz, has died of the zombie infection. He tells his remaining staff to shoot all the dead bodies in their heads. While digging a grave for a body, he hears a signal flare and follows it to discover the boat group. Menard sends them back to his mansion in order to fetch his wife, where they discover Paola's corpse being eaten by zombies. The group fends off an attack against them and escapes in a jeep, with West suffering an ankle injury when the vehicle veers off-road after slamming into a zombie. Resting in a jungle clearing, the group realize they have encountered a Conquistador-era graveyard; Barrett is killed when one of the corpses rises from the earth and bites out her throat.

As more corpses reanimate, the group flees to the local hospital, where Menard explains that the dead are rising as a result of a voodoo curse which he has been trying to stop. The hospital is besieged by zombies, and Menard is killed by a reanimated Fritz. As the zombies attempt to enter, those being treated for infection inside the hospital also reanimate, killing several hospital staff who have stayed behind. As the dead outside breach the door, Bowles and Hull set the building on fire; the undead Barrett bites Hull but is shot in the head by West. Bowles, West and Hull escape to the boat and leave the island. At the sea, Hull dies of his infection, and his body is locked in a cabin to be used as evidence of what has happened. However, as the boat approaches New York again, a radio broadcast reports that the city is under attack from zombies—the result of the initial attack in the harbor.

Production

Pre-production

	
Zombi 2 serves as a sequel to Zombi, a re-edited European release of George A. Romero's 1978 film Dawn of the Dead. Zombi had been edited by Dario Argento and given a new score by the Italian band Goblin, and proved successful upon its release in Italy. As Italian copyright law allows any film to be marketed as a sequel to another work, the film was quickly greenlit and financed by producer Fabrizio De Angelis. Enzo G. Castellari was offered to direct Zombi 2, but turned it down as he did not feel he would be the right director for a horror film. Director Lucio Fulci was De Angelis' second choice for the project, and was hired based on his handling of violent scenes in his previous films Sette note in nero and Non si sevizia un paperino. Fulci claimed to not having knowledge of the film's title including 2 as a way to tie in with Dawn, and was very displeased with his inability to protest the film's distributors.

Screenwriter Dardano Sacchetti had already worked with Fulci on Sette note in nero. Sacchetti has since stated that his initial script for Zombi 2—originally written under the title Nightmare Island—had been influenced by The Island of Doctor Moreau and had been intended to return to "classic zombie tales", such as I Walked with a Zombie, The Walking Dead or Voodoo Island. Sacchetti began work on this script in July 1978, before it was optioned by Angelis' company Variety Films that December and re-tooled as Zombi 2. Lead star McCulloch was cast primarily on the success in Italy of the 1975 BBC television series Survivors, which had impressed producer Ugo Tucci.

Filming
Production occurred during June and July 1979. Filming took place in Latina, Italy, as well as in New York City and Santo Domingo. Several of the actors' contracts had specified being provided with trailers for the duration of production. However, none were present when filming started and only Johnson was able to convince the producers to provide one. McCulloch and Johnson had known each other for many years by the time they collaborated on Zombi 2, having first met while they were members of the Royal Shakespeare Company in 1962, with the younger McCulloch coming to idolise Johnson's work. The underwater scene featuring a shark attack was devised by Ugo Tucci, and was shot without Fulci's approval, by Giannetto De Rossi, in Isla Mujeres, with the zombie portrayed by a local shark trainer.

Soundtrack

The score to Zombi 2 was composed by Fabio Frizzi, who frequently scored Fulci's works, including Sette note in nero, I quattro dell'apocalisse and Sella d'argento previously. Zombi 2 marked the first time the two had worked together on a straight horror movie as opposed to their previous spaghetti Western and giallo work. Frizzi would go on to compose for many more horror films with and without Fulci.

Frizzi's work on Zombi 2—particularly "Seq. 6", the sequence composed for the eye-gouging scene—was inspired by the melody of the Beatles' 1967 song "A Day in the Life". Elsewhere in the score, Frizzi included Caribbean musical cues, which he noted were intended to "pleasantly deceive" the audience. A medley of the score was later included as part of Frizzi's 2013 Fulci 2 Frizzi live tour, including the 2014 live album release Fulci 2 Frizzi: Live at Union Chapel. The score itself was released on vinyl by Death Waltz Records in 2015, with new artwork by Tom Beauvais.

Track listing

Release
Zombi 2 was first released on 25 August 1979 in Italy with a running time of 91 minutes, before being released in English-speaking markets in 1980. The film would go on to gross over ₤3,000,000,000 worldwide, significantly higher than its ₤410,000,000 budget. Zombi 2 has also been released under the titles Sanguella, The Island of the Living Dead, Zombie Flesh Eaters, Zombie, Zombie: The Dead Walk Among Us, Gli Ultimi Zombi, Woodoo, L'Enfer de Zombies, Zombie 2: The Dead Are Among Us and Nightmare Island.

Upon its release in the United Kingdom on 2 January 1980, the British Board of Film Classification required a total of one minute and forty-six seconds of material to be cut in order to obtain an X rating; its most recent home release on 1 August 2005 passed for an 18 rating with no cuts required. However, the 1980 release found itself classified as a "video nasty", having been considered a breach of the Obscene Publications Act. This classification, and the de facto "ban" it involved, has subsequently been used for publicity when advertising future home video releases.

Home media
Zombi 2 has been released several times on home video, beginning with a 1981 VHS version by VIPCO (Video Instant Picture Company) following the theatrical cuts directed by the BBFC. VIPCO produced an uncut release, marketed as the "strong uncut version", on VHS the following year. This is the release which was widely confiscated as a "video nasty". Further VHS releases followed in 1991 and 1994, with the latter being edited for widescreen viewing. The film was first released on DVD by VIPCO in 2004 with minor cuts, and uncut by Anchor Bay Entertainment in 2005. Other DVD releases include a 2004 version by Cornerstone Media, and a 2012 DVD and Blu-ray combination version by Arrow Films.

Reception
Zombi 2 grossed higher in the domestic Italian box office than its predecessor, leading to future sequels—Fulci began directing Zombi 3 before illness forced him to hand over the reins to Bruno Mattei and Claudio Fragasso, the latter of whom would also direct Zombi 4. The film was nominated for the Saturn Award for Best Make-up at the 8th Saturn Awards in 1981.

In a contemporary review, Tom Milne reviewed an 89-minute English-language dub in the Monthly Film Bulletin and compared the film to Dawn of the Dead. While noting that the cast was competent and the film featured "sometimes effective make-up work", Milne opined that the film "lacks—for all weaknesses of Romero's film—even a tenth of the minatory charge harboured by Zombies." The review noted that the censorship trimmed a "promisingly gruesome sequence" with a corpse undergoing an autopsy. In Italy, La Stampa described the film as "pedestrian", as well finding it hard to bear Olga Karlatos' character's death scene.

In a 2012 review for The Guardian, Phelim O'Neill described the film as "the ultimate undead movie", praising its commitment to gory scenes and convincing effects. O'Neill felt that the film stood the passage of time well, and explained that this was "because it delivers, plain and simple". He also highlighted Frizzi's work on the score, and summed the film up as "a real influence on what followed". Anne Billson, writing for The Daily Telegraph in 2013, included Zombi 2 in her list of the top ten zombie films, describing its opening scenes as "sublimely creepy" and the eye-gouging scene as "memorably nasty". Writing for the Daily Mirror, James Kloda praised Fulci's directing, finding that he consistently made evocative use of particular shots to accentuate the film's action or horror. Kloda felt that the film "can often blind with its shock violence but is well worth the look".

Writing for AllMovie, Robert Firsching described Zombi 2 as a "relatively well made shocker" which "led to the zombie-gore film becoming the dominant motif of 1980s Italian horror". Firsching rated the film three stars out of five. Empire Kim Newman awarded the film two stars out of five, chalking up much of its "video nasty" reputation to the "eye gouging" scene, comparing this unfavourably to similar material in 1929's Un Chien Andalou. Newman did compliment several sequences as interesting, particularly one underwater scene depicting a zombie attacking a shark, but found that overall the film did not "keep up the pace or plausibility sufficiently".

Its consensus reads "Zombi 2 is an absurdly graphic zombie movie legendary for some gory scenes and nothing in between". On Metacritic, the film has a score of 54 out of 100 based on reviews from 8 critics, indicating "mixed or average reviews".

Footnotes

References

External links 
 
 
 
 Zombi 2 at Variety Distribution
 

1979 films
1979 horror films
1970s Italian-language films
Italian sequel films
Apocalyptic films
Films directed by Lucio Fulci
Films scored by Fabio Frizzi
Films set in the Caribbean
Films shot in the Dominican Republic
Films set in New York City
Films set on fictional islands
Films shot in Italy
Films shot in New York City
Obscenity controversies in film
Italian splatter films
Italian zombie films
Zombi (film series)
Films about Voodoo
Unofficial sequel films
Italian supernatural horror films
Video nasties
1970s exploitation films
Films about viral outbreaks
Italian exploitation films